Basketball at the 1984 Summer Olympics was the eleventh appearance of the sport of basketball as an official Olympic medal event. It took place at The Forum in Inglewood, California, United States from July 29 to August 10. The United States won the gold medal in both events, with the women's team's victory marking their first-ever gold medal. Due to the boycott, the Soviet Union and Hungary withdrew from the tournament. The former, having already qualified for both events was replaced by West Germany in the men's competition, while both nations' women's teams were replaced by Australia and South Korea.

Medal summary

Qualification
A NOC may enter up to one men's team with 12 players and up to one women's team with 12 players. Automatic qualifications were granted to the host country for both events plus the gold and silver medal winners from the previous Olympic Games in the men's tournament, and the champion at the 1983 FIBA World Championship in the women's tournament. Additional spots for the men's tournament were decided via the continental championships held by FIBA, while additional spots for the women's competition were assigned to the top six teams in a tournament held in Havana, Cuba.

Men

Women

 Withdrew from the tournament.
 Replaced the Soviet Union.
 Replaced the Soviet Union and Hungary.

Format
Men's tournament:
 Two groups of six teams are formed, where the top four from each group advance to the knockout stage.
 Fifth and sixth places from each group form an additional bracket to decide 9th–12th places in the final ranking.
 In the quarterfinals, the matchups are as follows: A1 vs. B4, A2 vs. B3, A3 vs. B2 and A4 vs. B1.
 The four teams eliminated from the quarterfinals form an additional bracket to decide 5th–8th places in the final ranking.
 The winning teams from the quarterfinals meet in the semifinals.
 The winning teams from the semifinals contest the gold medal. The losing teams contest the bronze.

Women's tournament:
 One round-robin group is formed containing all six teams, where the top two compete for the gold medal, while the third and fourth places compete for the bronze medal in an additional match. 
 The remaining two teams finish with their group rank in the final standings.

Tie-breaking criteria:
 Head to head results
 Goal average (not the goal difference) between the tied teams
 Goal average of the tied teams for all teams in its group

Men's tournament

Preliminary round
The top four places in each of the preliminary round groups advanced to the eight team, single-elimination knockout stage, where Group A teams would meet Group B teams. Both hosts United States and reigning Olympic Champions Yugoslavia advanced undefeated to the knockout phase. China, Egypt, Brazil, and France placed fifth and sixth in their respective groups and competed in the classification round.

Group A

Group B

Knockout stage

Championship bracket

Classification brackets
5th–8th Place

9th–12th Place

Women's tournament

Preliminary round
The first two places in the preliminary group compete for the gold medal, while the third and fourth places compete for the bronze. The remaining teams' group ranking determines their positions in the final standings. With the withdrawal of the Soviet Union's women's team, a new Olympic champion was to be crowned in Los Angeles. The host nation's team went through the first round undefeated and won their first gold medal against South Korea, one of the teams invited to replace the Soviet Union and Hungary. China, the other Asian representative, earned a bronze medal by defeating Canada. Yugoslavia's team couldn't repeat their bronze medal performance from the previous tournament and finished at the bottom of the rankings.

Medal matches
Gold Medal

Bronze Medal

Final standings

See also
 Basketball at the 1984 Summer Olympics – Men's team rosters
 Basketball at the 1984 Summer Olympics – Women's team rosters
 Basketball at the Friendship Games

References
 Official Olympic Report
 USA Basketball
 1984 Olympic Games: Tournament for Men, FIBA Archive.
 1984 Olympic Games: Tournament for Women, FIBA Archive.

 
basketball
1984
1984 in basketball
1984–85 in American basketball
International basketball competitions hosted by the United States
Basketball competitions in Los Angeles